Taşköprü (literally "stone bridge") is a coastal town in Çiftlikköy district of Yalova Province, Turkey. The population of Taşköprü is 3237 as of 2011. Taşköprü was founded by a group of Turkish families from  Bulgaria  (which had recently gained independence) in 1902. The name of the settlement refers to a 400-year-old Ottoman bridge at the east of the town.

References

Populated places in Yalova Province
Towns in Turkey
Populated places in Çiftlikköy District